Centrobin is a protein that in humans is encoded by the CNTROB gene.
It is a centriole-associated protein that asymmetrically localizes to the daughter centriole, and is required for centriole duplication and cytokinesis.

References

External links

Further reading